Mount Meharry is the highest mountain in Western Australia.

The Pandjima peoples are the traditional owners of the area. The indigenous name for Mount Meharry is 
Wirlbiwirlbi.

History
Mount Meharry is named after William Thomas Meharry (1912–1967), Chief Geodetic Surveyor for Western Australia from 1959 to 1967.  It was discovered by Surveyor Trevor Markey and his party in 1967. Tom Meharry directed the survey party and performed the calculations that confirmed the mountain was the highest peak in Western Australia, being  higher than Mount Bruce which lies 62 km northwest of Mount Meharry.

After Meharry's sudden death on 16 May 1967 the Nomenclature Advisory Committee (now the Geographic Names Committee) recommended to the Minister for Lands that the recently discovered peak be named after him. The Minister for Lands Stewart Bovell approved this on 28 July 1967 and a notice naming the peak was published in the Western Australian Government Gazette on 15 September 1967.

In 1999, Gina Rinehart, daughter of Lang Hancock applied to the Geographic Names Committee to rename the mountain after her father. The application was declined and in 2002 she lobbied the then-Premier Geoff Gallop with the same proposal. He, too, declined the request.

Geography
The summit of Mt Meharry can be reached from the Great Northern Highway via an unsealed road  in length and a vehicular track  in length.  Permission should be sought from the managers of the land over which the road and track pass.  These are Juna Downs Station and the Department of Parks and Wildlife, which manages Karijini National Park.  In dry conditions, a two-wheel-drive vehicle can reach the national park boundary at about 800 metres altitude, requiring a walk of about 7 kilometres to the summit.

References

Meharry
Hamersley Range